Any.do is a productivity platform aimed at task and project management. It is available on mobile, web, and wearables with built-in integrations including calendars, chat applications, and virtual assistants.

History 
Any.do was co-founded by Omer Perchik, Yoni Lindenfeld, and Itay Kahana. Its HQ is located in Tel Aviv, Israel. 

Any.do originally launched on Android in November 2011 and within 30 days, reached over 500,000 downloads and 40 million users by 2022. 

In 2016 Any.do added a built-in calendar, a freemium subscription model Any.do Premium and AI Assistant software that offers to complete some tasks on demand.

In 2023, Any.do launched its team collaboration tier for teams named Any.do Workspace.

Prior to Any.do, Perchik, Kahana and Lindenfeld launched a simpler task list app on Android called Taskos.

Design 

On October 9, 2013, The Verge reported Any.do to be the one of the inspirations behind Jony Ive's iOS 7 redesign, and others noted its similarities to the revamped Apple operating system.

Funding 

Any.do announced $1 million in angel funding in November 2011.

By May 2013 the company had raised $3.5 million from Genesis Partners, Eric Schmidt’s Innovation Endeavors, Blumberg Capital, Joe Lonsdale of Palantir Technologies, Brian Koo of Formation 8, Joe Greenstein of Flixster, and Felicis Ventures.  The company raised additional funding from investors including Jerry Yang of AME Cloud Ventures and Steve Chen of YouTube, among others, by October of that same year.

See also 
 Calendaring software

References

External links 
 

Calendaring software
Mobile software
Task management software
Software companies of Israel
Israeli companies established in 2010
Companies based in Tel Aviv